The Capital Plaza Office Tower (1972–2018), was a 338-foot tall, 28-story office skyscraper located at 500 Mero Street in Frankfort, Kentucky. It was the tallest building in Frankfort, Kentucky and the 11th tallest building in the state of Kentucky.

History
Construction for the tower started in 1968 and was completed in 1972 as part of the Capital Plaza Project, which also included the Frankfort Convention Center and Fountain Place Shoppes. The building was designed by architect Edward Durrell Stone, who was also the architect for the Aon Center (Then known as Standard Oil Building) in Chicago, Illinois, and General Motors Building in Manhattan, New York City, New York.

The building mainly housed state government offices.

By the early 2000s, the Capital Plaza Complex had fallen into disrepair including the Capital Plaza Office Tower, with sections of the plaza being closed off to pedestrians due to safety. In August 2008, a Lexington-based architecture firm and city officials recommended the demolition of the Capital Plaza Office Tower and redevelopment of the site, after determining it would be more cost efficient to demolish the tower and put a new building in its place.

Closure and demolition
In 2016, the building was abandoned and closed due to the poor structural condition of the building, the final tenants moved out by October 2016. In July 2016, the building went up for sale. Falling concrete and water leaks from the building were reported in its later years, and after two years of debate as to whether to restore or tear down the building, the decision was ultimately made to demolish the tower.

On March 11, 2018, at 1:30 PM, the Capital Plaza Office Tower was demolished via implosion with 1,500 pounds of explosives by main contractor Renascent, Inc. and subcontractor Controlled Demolition, Inc. to make room for a new 5-story office building, park, and 1,100-space parking garage.

In 2019, the Mayo-Underwood Building, a new state build opened in the same location, named after the former Mayo–Underwood School.

References

1972 establishments in Kentucky
2016 disestablishments in Kentucky
Buildings and structures in Frankfort, Kentucky
Buildings and structures demolished by controlled implosion
Demolished buildings and structures in Kentucky
Skyscraper office buildings in Kentucky
Government buildings completed in 1972
Buildings and structures demolished in 2018
Former skyscrapers